The 2001–02 season was the 107th season in the history of Plymouth Argyle Football Club, their 77th in the Football League, and 5th in the fourth tier of the English football league system. Their 12th-place finish in the 2000–01 season meant it was their fourth successive season playing in the Third Division.

Season summary
The club began the 2001–02 season in the Football League Third Division, following a disappointing 12th-place finish the previous year. There were signs of change at the club and they finished the season as champions, breaking numerous club records in the process, including a record haul of 102 points. They achieved 31 wins, 9 draws, and 6 defeats, from 46 games. Their leading goalscorer was Graham Coughlan with 11 goals in all competitions – an outstanding achievement for a centre-back. The club reached the second round of the FA Cup, drawing 1–1 at home with Bristol Rovers before losing the replay 3–2. They entered the League Cup in the first round and were eliminated away to Watford 1–0. They also competed in the Football League Trophy, where they bowed out in the first round after a 2–1 defeat away to Cheltenham Town. Notable players to begin their careers with the Pilgrims this season included Coughlan, Marino Keith, and Jason Bent.

Legend

Football League

League table

Pld = Matches played; W = Matches won; D = Matches drawn; L = Matches lost; GF = Goals for; GA = Goals against; GD = Goal difference; Pts = Points

Results summary

As of games played 20 April 2002

FA Cup

First Round

First round replay

Second Round

Second Round Replay

Football League Cup

First Round

Football League Trophy

Southern Section First Round

Players

First-team squad
Squad at end of season

Left club during season

Statistics

Appearances and goals
Key

# = Squad number; Pos = Playing position; P = Number of games played; G = Number of goals scored;  = Yellow cards;  = Red cards; GK = Goalkeeper; DF = Defender; MF = Midfielder; FW = Forward

Statistics do not include minor competitions or games played for other clubs. All players are listed by position and then surname.

Goalscorers

Awards

Transfers

Permanent
In

Out

Loans
In

Out

Notes

References

Plymouth Argyle F.C. seasons
Plymouth Argyle